Stuart Diver (born 14 January 1970 in New South Wales, Australia) is a ski instructor and was the sole survivor of the 1997 Thredbo landslide.

Thredbo landslide 
At 11.35pm, on 30 July 1997, 3,500 tonnes of rock and mud slid down the side of Thredbo, a ski resort in New South Wales, taking two ski lodges with it. The landslide killed 18 people, one of whom was Diver's first wife, Sally (née Donald). After 65 hours in sub-zero temperatures with only a small blanket and jacket, Diver was finally pulled from the rubble. After the incident, Diver wrote a biography, Survival, with journalist Simon Bouda, detailing his struggles with the experience of the disaster and the aftermath. Diver's experiences were also made into the Australian TV movie, Heroes' Mountain, where his character was played by actor Craig McLachlan.

Private life 
Diver has a Bachelor of Applied Science degree, is a level-three ski instructor and in 2012 he became Operations Manager of the Thredbo Ski Resort. After his wife Sally died in the Thredbo landslide,  Stuart remarried. With his wife Rosanna (née Cossettini), Stuart has a daughter, Alessia. 

Stuart owns a house above the disaster site, where he lived with his wife Rosanna and Alessia.  Rosanna died from breast cancer on 21 March 2015.

Diver has an active role promoting The Salvation Army and is one of the most well-known public faces of the charity. He has a brother Euan, mother Annette and father Steve.

References

External links
 "Survival", Stuart Diver, By Simon Bouda, 2006/03/06
 Thredbo survivor Stuart Diver supports Red Shield Appeal, MEDIA RELEASE – NEWS STORY FOR FRIDAY MAY 26TH 2006

1970 births
Living people
People from New South Wales
Sole survivors
Australian male skiers